Brooklyn Danielle Decker (born April 12, 1987) is an American model and actress, perhaps best known for her appearances in the Sports Illustrated Swimsuit Issue, including the cover of the 2010 issue. In addition to working for Victoria's Secret for the 2010 "Swim" collection, she has ventured into television with guest appearances on Chuck, Ugly Betty, The League, and Royal Pains. She made her feature film debut in Just Go with It (2011), and later starred in Battleship (2012) and What to Expect When You're Expecting (2012). In 2015, she was cast as a series regular, portraying Mallory Hanson, on Netflix's Grace and Frankie.

Early life 
Decker was born in Kettering, Ohio, a suburb of Dayton, the daughter of Tessa (née Moore), a nurse, and Stephen Decker, a pacemaker salesman. She has a younger brother, Jordan. She and her family moved to Middletown, Ohio, then to Matthews, North Carolina, a suburb of Charlotte. She graduated from David W. Butler High School.

Decker was discovered in a Charlotte shopping mall as a teenager, and began her modeling career as the face of Mauri Simone, a prom dress maker. She won the 2003 Model of the Year award at the Connections Model and Talent Convention.

Career

Decker has been featured in editorials in Teen Vogue, Cosmopolitan, FHM and Glamour and graced international covers of GQ, Esquire, Glamour and Flare. She has appeared in campaigns for The Gap, Intimissimi and Victoria's Secret and appeared in music videos for Jimmy Buffett and the band 3 Doors Down.

In 2005, within two months of moving to New York City, Decker auditioned for the Sports Illustrated Swimsuit Edition, in which she first appeared in 2006. She was again featured in the 2007 edition, and hosted the 2007 behind-the-scenes television special. She returned for a third consecutive time in 2008. Decker was chosen cover girl for the 2010 edition, shot on location in the Maldives islands. In 2007, she had a recurring feature on the CNN/SI website called "She Says, Z Says," along with Paul Zimmerman, discussing NFL football games of the week. Decker appeared in the 2007 made-for-television Lipshitz Saves the World. She worked for a period in Australia. She joined the cast of Sports New York to discuss the 2010 NCAA basketball tournament. In 2008, Decker rang the New York Stock Exchange bell with other Sports Illustrated models.

Decker made a guest appearance on NBC's Chuck, where she played a model applying to be a "Buy More Girl."
She made a guest appearance on USA Network's Royal Pains on July 30, 2009. Decker played swimsuit model Rachel, while Peter Jacobson played Alan, her nebbish husband.

On February 8, 2010, David Letterman announced on Late Show with David Letterman that Decker had been chosen as the 2010 Sports Illustrated Swimsuit covermodel. Calling her selection "the news of a lifetime," Decker admitted that her mother cried when she heard her daughter would grace the cover.

Decker served as a guest judge in the 5th cycle from Germany's Next Topmodel.
She was reportedly considered for the lead female role in Transformers: Dark of the Moon.
Decker won Esquire magazine's 2010 "Sexiest Woman Alive" bracket challenge.

MTV Networks' NextMovie.com named her one of the 'Breakout Stars to Watch for in 2011'.

In 2011, Decker was cast as the female lead, Samantha Shane, an Admiral's daughter who works as a physical therapist, in the film Battleship, which was based on the board game of the same name. The role allowed her to spend some time with the Wounded Warriors Project. She also traveled to medical hospitals in Pearl Harbor and San Antonio and worked with troops who came back injured from overseas. She was also part of the ensemble cast of the comedy What to Expect When You're Expecting (2012), based on the book of the same name. She played the wife of Dennis Quaid's character.

In 2015, Decker took on a leading role as Mallory Hanson, the daughter of Jane Fonda's character Grace, on the Netflix comedy series Grace and Frankie, and her performance has received critical acclaim. The series' seventh and final season aired in 2022.

She was named one of the "100 Hottest Women of All-Time" by Men's Health.

Personal life
Decker began dating American tennis player Andy Roddick in 2007, and they became engaged in March 2008. The couple married on April 17, 2009, and used to live in Roddick's home town of Austin, Texas; now they live in Charlotte, North Carolina. The couple have a son, Hank, born in 2015 and a daughter, Stevie, born in 2017.

Filmography

Film

Television

She has also appeared in several Dietz & Watson commercials along with her husband.

Accolades

References

External links

 
 
 

1987 births
21st-century American actresses
Actresses from Charlotte, North Carolina
Actresses from North Carolina
American film actresses
American television actresses
Living people
Female models from North Carolina
Female models from Ohio
People from Kettering, Ohio
People from Middletown, Ohio